Henry "Hank" Hicks Messick (August 14, 1922 – November 6, 1999) was an American investigative journalist and author, specializing in writing about organized crime.  He was best known for his biography of Meyer Lansky.

Messick was born in Happy Valley, North Carolina.  He received a master's degree from the University of Iowa.  He started his journalism career working at several newspapers in North Carolina.  From 1957 to 1963 he worked at the Louisville Courier-Journal where he reported on the extensive illegal gambling activities in Newport, Kentucky.  From 1963 to 1966 he worked at the Miami Herald, where he investigated police corruption.  He briefly worked for the Boston Traveler in 1967, but was fired after investigating the business activities of Joseph Linsey, one of the newspapers' shareholders and a former associate of mobster Charles "King" Solomon.  He then worked full-time as an author, writing 19 books.  He mostly wrote about organized crime in places outside New York City and Chicago, such as Kentucky, Florida, Bahamas, Cleveland and Hollywood.<ref>Hank Messick, Journalist And Author on Organized Crime. The New York Times, November 20, 1999</ref>The Mob-Chaser As Country Boy. The Washington Post, May 20, 1978

Bibliography

1967 The Silent Syndicate
1968 Syndicate in the Sun1968 Syndicate Wife: The Story of Ann Drahmann Coppola1969 Syndicate Abroad1969 Secret File1971 Lansky1972 John Edgar Hoover: An Inquiry into the Life and Times of John Edgar Hoover and His Relationship to the Continuing Partnership of Crime, Business, and Politics1972 The Mobs and the Mafia: The Illustrated History of Organized Crime  (with Burt Goldblatt)
1973 The Private Lives of Public Enemies (with Joseph L. Nellis)
1974 The Beauties and the Beasts: The Mob in Show Business1974 Gangs and Gangsters: The Illustrated History of Gangs from Jesse James to Murph the Surf (with Burt Goldblatt)
1975 Barboza (written with Joseph Barboza)
1974 Kidnapping: The Illustrated History from Its Origins to the Present (with Burt Goldblatt)
1976 The Only Game in Town: An Illustrated History of Gambling (with Burt Goldblatt)
1976 King's Mountain: The Epic of the Blue Ridge Mountain Men in the American Revolution1978 The Politics of Prosecution: Jim Thompson, Marie Everett, Richard Nixon, and the Trial of Otto Kerner1979 Of Grass and Snow: The Secret Criminal Elite1987 Desert Sanctuary1995 Razzle DazzleReferences

 May, Allan. Sterling, Roemer and Messick: A Sad Farewell''. AmericanMafia.com.

American investigative journalists
American male journalists
20th-century American journalists
Organized crime memoirists
Non-fiction writers about organized crime in the United States
1922 births
1999 deaths
University of Iowa alumni